This is a list of Welsh-language authors.

A
Richard Ithamar Aaron (1901–1987)
William Ambrose (Emrys) (1813–1873)
Gwynn ap Gwilym (1950–2016)
Charles Ashton (1848–1898)

B
William Ambrose Bebb (1894–1953)
Tom Beynon (1886–1961)
John Blackwell (Alun) (1797–1841)
Käthe Bosse-Griffiths (1910–1998)
David James Bowen (1925–2017)
Euros Bowen (1904–1988)
Geraint Bowen (1915–2011)
Siôn Bradford (1706–1785)
Robert Bryan (1858–1920)

C
Rhys Cadwaladr (fl. 1666–1690)
David Charles (1762–1834)
Thomas Charles (1755–1814)
Irma Chilton (1930–1990)
Morys Clynnog (1525–1581)

D
Aneirin Talfan Davies (1909–1980)
Edward Tegla Davies (1880–1967)
Gareth Alban Davies (1926–2009)
Grahame Davies (born 1964)
James Kitchener Davies (1902–1952)
John Davies (Dr John Davies, Mallwyd) (c. 1567–1644)
John Cadvan Davies (1846–1923)
John Humphreys Davies (1871–1926)
Lewis Davies (1863–1951)
Pennar Davies (1911–1996)
Richard Davies (c. 1501–1581)
Richard Davies (Mynyddog) (1833–1877)
Thomas Glynne Davies (1926–1988)
Walter Davies (Gwallter Mechain) (1761–1849)
Robert Jones Derfel (1824–1905)

E
Aled Eames (1921–1996)
Marion Eames (1921–2007)
David Miall Edwards (1873–1941)
Hywel Teifi Edwards (1934–2010)
Lewis Edwards (1809–1887)
Owen Morgan Edwards (1858–1920)
Roger Edwards (1811–1886)
Thomas Edwards (Twm o'r Nant) (1738–1810)
John Elias (1774–1841)
Islwyn Ffowc Elis (1924–2004)
Robert Elis (Cynddelw) (1812–1875)
Thomas Iorwerth Ellis (1899–1970)
Beriah Gwynfe Evans (1848–1927)
Christmas Evans (1776–1838)
Daniel Evans (Daniel Ddu o Geredigion) (1792–1846)
Daniel Silvan Evans (1818–1903)
David Emrys Evans (1891–1966)
Donald Evans (born 1940)
Ellis Humphrey Evans (Hedd Wyn) (1887–1917)
Gwynfor Evans (1912–2005)
Hugh Evans (1854–1934)
John Evans (I.D. Ffraid) (1814–1875)
Theophilus Evans (1693–1767)
William Evans (Wil Ifan) (1883–1968)
Albert Evans-Jones (Cynan) (1895–1970)

G
William Richard Philip George (1912–2006)
John Gwyn Griffiths (1911–2004)
Elis Gruffydd (c. 1490 – c. 1552)
Owen Gruffydd (c. 1643–1730)
Robert Geraint Gruffydd (1928–2015)
William John Gruffydd (1881–1954)
Bethan Gwanas (born 1962)

H
Joseph Harris (Gomer) (1773–1825)
Isaac Daniel Hooson (1880–1948)
Mererid Hopwood (born 1964)
Hugh Hughes (Y Bardd Coch o Fôn) (1693–1776)
John Ceiriog Hughes (1832–1887)
Jonathan Hughes (1721–1805)
Richard Cyril Hughes (born 1932)
Thomas Rowland Hughes (1903–1949)
Edward Morgan Humphreys (1882–1955)
Humphrey Humphreys (1648–1712)

I
Dafydd Ifans (born 1949)

J
Daniel James (Gwyrosydd) (1848–1920)
Edward James (c. 1569 – c. 1610)
Evan James (Ieuan ap Iago) (1809–1878)
David Jenkins (1912–2002)
John Jenkins (Gwili) (1872–1936)
Robert Thomas Jenkins (1881–1969)
John Thomas Job (1867–1938)
Bedwyr Lewis Jones (1933–1992)
Dafydd Jones (Dewi Dywyll) (1803–1868)
David James Jones (Gwenallt) (1899–1968)
Elizabeth Watkin-Jones (1888–1966)
Gwilym Richard Jones (1903–1993)
Harri Pritchard Jones (1933–2015)
John Jones (Jac Glan-y-gors) (1766–1821)
John Jones (Ioan Tegid) (1792–1852)
John Jones (Talhaiarn) (1810–1869)
John Jones (Myrddin Fardd) (1836–1921)
John Robert Jones (1911–1970)
Lewis Jones (Patagonia) (1897–1939)
Richard Goodman Jones (Dic Goodman) (1920–2013)
Robert Ambrose Jones (Emrys ap Iwan) (1848–1906)
Robert Maynard Jones (Bobi Jones) (1929–2017)
Thomas Jones (Dinbych) (1756–1820)
Thomas Gwynn Jones (1871–1949)
Thomas Llewelyn Jones (1915–2009)
Morris Kyffin (c. 1555–1598)

L
Thomas Levi (1825–1916)
Alun Lewis (1915–1944)
Gwyneth Lewis
Henry Lewis (1889–1968)
Hywel David Lewis (1910–1992)
Robyn Lewis (born 1929)
Saunders Lewis (1893–1985)

Ll
John Lloyd-Jones (1885–1956)
Alan Llwyd (born 1948)
Angharad Llwyd (1780–1866)
Morgan Llwyd (1619–1659)
Robin Llywelyn (born 1958)

M
Dafydd Llwyd Mathau (fl. earlier 17th c.)
Wiliam Midleton (fl. 1550–1600)
Gareth Miles (born 1938)
Derec Llwyd Morgan (born 1943)
Elena Puw Morgan (1900–1973)
Eluned Morgan (1870–1938)
John Morgan (1688–1733)
Prys Morgan (born 1937)
William Morgan (1545–1604)
Lewis Morris (Llywelyn Ddu o Fôn) (1701–1765)
Richard Morris (1703–1779)
John Morris-Jones (1864–1929)

N
Thomas Evan Nicholas (Niclas y Glais) (1879–1971)

O
Owain Owain (1929–1993)
Robin Llwyd ab Owain (born 1959)
Daniel Owen (1836–1895)
David Owen (Dewi Wyn o Eifion) (1784–1841)
David Owen (Brutus) (1795–1866)
Gerallt Lloyd Owen (born 1944)
Goronwy Owen (Goronwy Ddu o Fôn) (1723–1769)
William David Owen (1874–1925)
William Owen Pughe (1759–1835)

P
Gwenlyn Parry (1932–1991)
John Parry (1776–1851)
Robert Parry (1540–1612)
Robert Williams Parry (1884–1956)
Thomas Parry (1904–1985)
Thomas Herbert Parry-Williams (1887–1975)
Meirion Pennar (1944–2010)
John Price (1502–1555)
Thomas Price (Carnhuanawc) (1787–1848)
Caradog Prichard (1904–1980)
Rhys Prichard (Yr Hen Ficer) (1579–1644)
Edmwnd Prys (1543–1623)
Gwilym Puw (c. 1618 – c. 1689)

Ph
Eluned Phillips (1914-2009)

R
Evan Rees (Dyfed) (1850–1923)
Ioan Bowen Rees (1929–1999)
Thomas Rees (1815–1885)
Thomas Ifor Rees (1890–1977)
William Rees (Gwilym Hiraethog)
David Richards (Dafydd Ionawr) (1751–1827)
Thomas Richards (1878–1962)
Gruffydd Robert (before 1532 – after 1598)
Brynley Francis Roberts (born 1931)
David Roberts (Dewi Havhesp) (1831–1884)
Emrys Roberts (1929–2012)
Kate Roberts (1891–1985)
Samuel Roberts (writer) (1800–1885)
Wiliam Owen Roberts (born 1960)
Dafydd Rowlands (1931–2001)
John Rowlands (author) (born 1938)
William Rowlands (Gwilym Lleyn) (1802–1865)

Rh
Edward Prosser Rhys (1901–1945)
Morgan Rhys (1716–1779)
Siôn Dafydd Rhys (1534 – c. 1609)

S
William Salesbury (c. 1520 – c. 1584)
William Saunders (1806–1851)
Simwnt Fychan (c. 1530–1606)

T
David Thomas (Dewi Hefin) (1828–1909)
David Thomas (1880–1967)
Ebenezer Thomas (Eben Fardd) (1802–1863)
Gwyn Thomas (1936–2016)
Robert Thomas (Ap Vychan) (1809–1880)
Ronald Stuart Thomas (1913–2000)
William Thomas (Islwyn) (1832–1878)
William Thomas (Gwilym Marles) (1834–1879)
Angharad Tomos (born 1958)

W
Urien Wiliam (born 1929)
Colin H Williams (born 1950)
David John Williams (1885–1970)
Edward Williams (Iolo Morganwg) (1747–1826)
Eliseus Williams (Eifion Wyn) (1867–1926)
Gareth F. Williams (1955–2016)
Glanmor Williams (1920–2005 )
Griffith Williams (Gutyn Peris) (1769–1838)
Gwynne Williams (born 1937)
Ifor Williams (1881–1965)
John Ellis Williams (born 1924)
John Lloyd Williams (1854–1945)
John Owen Williams (Pedrog) (1892–1973)
John Richard Williams (J.R. Tryfanwy) (1867–1924)
Morris Williams (Nicander) (1809–1874)
Moses Williams (1685–1742)
Owen Williams (Owen Gwyrfai) (1790–1874)
Peter Bailey Williams (1763–1836)
Richard Bryn Williams (1902–1981)
Richard Hughes Williams (Dic Tryfan) (c. 1878–1919)
Robert Williams (Robert ap Gwilym Ddu) (1766–1850)
Robert Williams (Trebor Mai) (1830–1877)
Robert Dewi Williams (1870–1955)
Rowland Williams (Hwfa Môn) (1823–1905)
Rhydwen Williams (1916–1997)
Thomas Marchant Williams (1845–1914)
Waldo Williams (1904–1971)
William Williams (Pantycelyn) (1717–1791)
William Williams (Caledfryn) (1801–1869)
William Williams (Creuddynfab) (1814–1869)
William Williams (Crwys) (1875–1968)
William Llewelyn Williams (1867–1922)
Ellis Wynne (1671–1734)
Eirug Wyn (1950–2004)

 
 
 
 
Author
Author
Author Cymraeg
Welsh